Paul Howell may refer to:

 Paul Howell (golfer) (born 1991), American golfer and World Long Drive competitor
 Paul Howell (MEP) (1951–2008), British politician who served as a Member of the European Parliament
 Paul Howell (MP), British politician, MP for Sedgefield
 Paul Howell (rugby league), New Zealand rugby league player

See also 
Paul Powell (disambiguation)